Line C-9, formerly known as the Guadarrama Electric Railway, is a narrow-gauge mountain railway incorporated into Madrid's Cercanías commuter rail network. Although classified as a commuter rail line, Line C-9 primarily serves the ski resorts at Cotos and Navacerrada Passes, connecting with the rest of the commuter rail system with the Line C-8 at Cercedilla Station. Line C-9 is the only metre-gauge railway among the Cercanías Madrid lines.

History
The railway was first conceived in the 1910s as a means of connecting urban Madrid to the Guadarrama Mountains via the Navacerrada Pass. Construction began in 1919 and the section connecting Cercedilla on the Madrid-Segovia Line with Navacerrada opened on 12 July 1923 as the Guadarrama Electric Railway. The opening was attended by the King and Queen of Spain. The line was originally electrified at 1000 V dc. Service was interrupted during the Spanish Civil War but resumed in 1940. In 1954, the line was acquired by the state-controlled RENFE, the only metre gauge line to be operated by them. RENFE began constructing the extension to Cotos Pass in 1959.

From 1973 to 1975, the entire line was renovated and modernized and the line voltage increased to 1500 V dc.  The line was anticipated to continue through the mountains to Segovia, but this plan was abandoned.  In 1990, the Guadarrama Electric Railway was incorporated into RENFE's commuter rail network, Cercanías Madrid, and renamed Line C-9.  The portion of the line between Navacerrada and Cotos was closed from 2011 to 2012 to undergo renovations.

Rolling stock

The original Swiss built railcars ordered in 1922 remained in service until 1964. Initially there were two motor cars and two trailers with an extra motor car and two trailers being added in 1936. They were replaced by second hand SECN stock, nicknamed Navals, from other metre gauge lines, principally from the Ferrocarill de la Loma. These were six motor cars, numbered 3006–3011, and two trailers, numbered 6011–6012. They were later classified by RENFE as Class 431. The brakes on these units proved insufficient for the steeply graded sections of the line with one unit running away approaching Cercedilla, being brought under control just in time. They were gradually replaced by MTM Class 442 units between 1976 and 1982.

In 1967 the line acquired a Stadler diesel shunter, fitted with a rotary snowplough, for engineering use on the line. Initially numbered 111 it was renumbered 300-111-2.

Preservation
The original Swiss railcar, CN1, is preserved at Cercedilla. A railcar and trailer, CN2 and CNR1, have been preserved at the railway museum in Madrid.

Route
From here, the railway line crosses the drainage divide of the Guadarrama Mountains and enters Valsaín Valley in Segovia Province.

Stations

Gallery

References

Cercanías Madrid
Metre gauge railways in Spain